Plamen Petrov (born 6 September 1985) is a Bulgarian football player. He currently plays for Vereya Stara Zagora as a goalkeeper.

Honours

Club
 Beroe
Bulgarian Cup:
Winner: 2009-10

External links
 Profile at beroe.eu

1985 births
Living people
Association football goalkeepers
Bulgarian footballers
First Professional Football League (Bulgaria) players
PFC Rodopa Smolyan players
PFC Beroe Stara Zagora players
People from Radnevo